can refer to:

 Gaius Flaminius (consul 223 BC)
 Gaius Flaminius (consul 187 BC)